Chromosome 2 is one of the twenty-three pairs of chromosomes in humans. People normally have two copies of this chromosome. Chromosome 2 is the second-largest human chromosome, spanning more than 242 million base pairs and representing almost eight percent of the total DNA in human cells.

Chromosome 2 contains the HOXD homeobox gene cluster.

Chromosomes

Humans have only twenty-three pairs of chromosomes, while all other extant members of Hominidae have twenty-four pairs. It is believed that Neanderthals and Denisovans had twenty-three pairs. 

Human chromosome 2 is a result of an end-to-end fusion of two ancestral chromosomes. The evidence for this includes:
 The correspondence of chromosome 2 to two ape chromosomes. The closest human relative, the chimpanzee, has nearly identical DNA sequences to human chromosome 2, but they are found in two separate chromosomes. The same is true of the more distant gorilla and orangutan.
 The presence of a vestigial centromere. Normally a chromosome has just one centromere, but in chromosome 2 there are remnants of a second centromere in the q21.3–q22.1 region.
 The presence of vestigial telomeres. These are normally found only at the ends of a chromosome, but in chromosome 2 there are additional telomere sequences in the q13 band, far from either end of the chromosome.

Genes

Number of genes
The following are some of the gene count estimates of human chromosome 2. Because researchers use different approaches to genome annotation their predictions of the number of genes on each chromosome vary. Among various projects, the collaborative consensus coding sequence project (CCDS) takes an extremely conservative strategy. So CCDS's gene number prediction represents a lower bound on the total number of human protein-coding genes.

List of genes

The following is a partial list of genes on human chromosome 2. For complete list, see the link in the infobox on the right.

p-arm
Partial list of the genes located on p-arm (short arm) of human chromosome 2:

q-arm
Partial list of the genes located on q-arm (long arm) of human chromosome 2:

Related disorders and traits 

The following diseases and traits are related to genes located on chromosome 2:

 2p15-16.1 microdeletion syndrome
 Autism
 Alport syndrome
 Alström syndrome
 Amyotrophic lateral sclerosis
 Brachydactyly type D
 Cleft chin
 Congenital hypothyroidism
 Crigler-Najjar types I/II
 Dementia with Lewy bodies
 Ehlers–Danlos syndrome
 Ehlers–Danlos syndrome, classical type
 Ehlers–Danlos syndrome, vascular type
 Fibrodysplasia ossificans progressiva
 Gilbert's syndrome
 Harlequin type ichthyosis
 Hemochromatosis
 Hemochromatosis type 4
 Hereditary nonpolyposis colorectal cancer
 Infantile-onset ascending hereditary spastic paralysis
 Juvenile primary lateral sclerosis
 Lactose intolerance
 Long-chain 3-hydroxyacyl-coenzyme A dehydrogenase deficiency
 Lowry-Wood syndrome
 Maturity onset diabetes of the young type 6
 Mitochondrial trifunctional protein deficiency
 Nonsyndromic deafness
 Photic sneeze reflex
 Primary hyperoxaluria
 Primary pulmonary hypertension
 Sitosterolemia (knockout of either ABCG5 or ABCG8)
 Sensenbrenner syndrome
 Synesthesia
 Waardenburg syndrome

Cytogenetic band

References

External links

 
 

Chromosomes (human)
Human evolution